"Pussycat" is the second single from Wyclef Jean's third studio album, Masquerade. The song features a sample of "What's New Pussycat?" by Tom Jones.

Track listing
German CD1
 "Pussycat" (Album Version) (featuring Tom Jones)  
 "Pussycat" (Street Remix - Clean) (featuring Loon, Busta Rhymes And Robby & Ryan Of City High)

German CD2
 "Pussycat" (Album Version) (featuring Tom Jones)  
 "Pussycat" (Street Remix - Clean) (featuring Loon, Busta Rhymes And Robby & Ryan Of City High)  
 "Pussycat" (Blackkat Remix)  
 "Two Wrongs" (So So Def Remix) (featuring Claudette Ortiz Of City High)  
 "Pussycat" (Video)

Charts

Release history

References

2002 singles
Wyclef Jean songs
Songs written by Wyclef Jean
Songs written by Jerry Duplessis
Song recordings produced by Jerry Duplessis